Diana Lake Provincial Park is a  provincial park located 16 kilometres east of the city of Prince Rupert in the North Coast Regional District of British Columbia, Canada. The park was established by BC Parks in 1980.

Description
The park provides lake, lakeshore and forest recreation opportunities for local residents and travelers along the Highway 16 corridor. Diana Lake is the primary freshwater recreation site in the region. 

Diana Creek nature trail winds along Diana Creek through coastal temperate rainforest. The MacDonald Trail starts in the park, steps through several blanket bogs, and runs up to MacDonald peak.

All five species of pacific salmon, as well as steelhead, rainbow and Dolly Varden trout can be found in the lakes and creeks around this park.

From May 15 to September 15, the day-use area is accessible. This park does not have access to drinkable water.

Images

See also
Prudhomme Lake Provincial Park

References

External links
Diana Lake Provincial Park

Provincial parks of British Columbia
North Coast of British Columbia
1980 establishments in British Columbia
Protected areas established in 1980